Wang Xiao (born 18 April 1992 in Anshan, Liaoning, China) is a Chinese footballer currently playing for Chinese club Yuxi Yukun as a forward.

Club career
After playing in the youth squad of Shandong Luneng Taishan, Wang transferred to Chinese Super League side Shenzhen Ruby in 2011. He was loaned to China League Two club Guizhou Zhicheng in July 2012. He made 5 appearances in League Two as Guizhou Zhicheng finished first place in the League Two and won promotion back to the top flight at the first attempt.
Wang made a free transfer to Hangzhou Greentown on 19 January 2013.

In March 2016, Wang transferred to China League Two side Baotou Nanjiao. On 26 December 2016, Wang moved to fellow League Two side Yinchuan Helanshan.

Career statistics 
Statistics accurate as of match played 12 October 2019.

Honours
Guizhou Zhicheng
China League Two: 2012

References

Living people
1992 births
Chinese footballers
Sportspeople from Anshan
Footballers from Liaoning
Shenzhen F.C. players
Guizhou F.C. players
Zhejiang Professional F.C. players
Chinese Super League players
China League One players
Association football forwards